River of Mystery is a 1971 television film directed by Paul Stanley and starring Vic Morrow.

Stars 
Vic Morrow as Phil Munger
Claude Akins  as Dorata
Niall MacGinnis as Garwood Drum
Edmond O'Brien as R.J. Twitchell
Louise Sorel as Elena
Nico Minardos as the Alacron

References 
Movies made for television: the telefeature and the mini-series, 1964-1979 Escrito por Alvin H. Marill

External links

1971 films
1970s English-language films